The Trieste electoral district (official name: Friuli-Venezia Giulia - 01 uninominal district) was an uninominal district for the Chamber of Deputies.

Territory 
As required by law, it was part of the Friuli-Venezia Giulia electoral constituency.

The Trieste-district was composed by three comuni: Trieste, Muggia and San Dorligo della Valle.

It was part of the Friuli-Venezia Giulia - 01 plurinominal district.

Elected

Electoral results

References

Chamber of Deputies constituencies in Italy
Constituencies established in 2017